Beaches Corners is an unincorporated community located in the town of Ettrick, Trempealeau County, Wisconsin, United States. The community was named for the Beach family. Charles G. Beach emigrated from Vermont in the mid 1860s. His sons Joseph and Fred were owners and editors of the Whitehall Times in the late 19th century.

Notes

Unincorporated communities in Trempealeau County, Wisconsin
Unincorporated communities in Wisconsin